Famoussa Koné (born 3 May 1994) is a Malian professional footballer who plays as a striker for Turkish club Ankara Keçiörengücü.

Career

Club
A former youth international for Mali, Koné was recruited by Bastia in 2012 as a youth asset, along with Abdoulaye Keita. He made his professional debut two years later, in a Ligue 1 defeat against Saint-Étienne in December 2014, coming in for Junior Tallo.

On 2 July 2017, Koné signed for Gabala FK on a one-year loan deal.

International
Koné represented the Mali U20s at the 2013 African U-20 Championship.

Career statistics

Club

External links

References

1994 births
Living people
Sportspeople from Bamako
Malian footballers
Malian expatriate footballers
Association football forwards
Mali under-20 international footballers
SC Bastia players
Ligue 1 players
Expatriate footballers in France
Malian expatriate sportspeople in France
TFF First League players
Samsunspor footballers
Göztepe S.K. footballers
Adanaspor footballers
Ankara Keçiörengücü S.K. footballers
Expatriate footballers in Turkey
Malian expatriate sportspeople in Turkey
Gabala FC players
Expatriate footballers in Azerbaijan
Malian expatriate sportspeople in Azerbaijan
Azerbaijan Premier League players
21st-century Malian people